Garry Earl Roggenburk (born April 16, 1940) is an American former Major League Baseball pitcher. Born in Cleveland, Ohio, he was a high school teammate of Mike Hegan's at Saint Ignatius High School. The two would later be teammates with the 1969 Seattle Pilots.

Roggenburk attended the University of Dayton, where he played college baseball and starred in basketball, leading Dayton to the 1962 National Invitation Tournament championship. He entered professional baseball in 1962 when he was signed by the Minnesota Twins. He was also selected in the fourth round (34th overall) of the 1962 NBA draft by the San Francisco Warriors.

Major League Baseball career
Roggenburk made his Major League debut on April 20, 1963, with the Twins, playing against the Chicago White Sox at Comiskey Park with 7,137 people attending the game. Roggenburk was called to replace Bill Dailey in the sixth inning. He pitched only  of an inning while walking one batter and allowing one run. Roggenburk was then replaced by Frank Sullivan, who surrendered a two-run home run to Dave Nicholson, one of those earned runs charged against Roggenburk. The Twins lost the game 10–7 in the tenth inning, with Roggenburk getting a no-decision.

Roggenburk appeared in 60 games for the Twins over parts of three seasons before being purchased by the Boston Red Sox on September 7, 1966. He worked in 12 total games for Boston and seven for Seattle.

In 79 MLB appearances, 73 of them as a relief pitcher, he fashioned a 6–9 won–lost record, with a 3.64 earned run average and seven saves. Four of his six starting pitcher assignments came with the 1969 Pilots. He threw his only MLB complete game July 8 against the California Angels, a five-hit, 3–1 Seattle victory at Sicks Stadium. In 126 big-league innings pitched, he surrendered 132 hits and 64 walks; he struck out 56.

Activity after retirement
After Roggenburk's playing career ended, Roggenburk became a pitching coach in the Red Sox' minor-league system, and later became general manager (GM) from 1978 to 1983 for the Winter Haven Red Sox, Boston's affiliate in the Class A Florida State League. After leaving baseball, he returned to Cleveland and he worked as a real-estate appraiser. As of 2006, Roggenburk was living in Avon, Ohio.

References

External links

1940 births
Living people
American men's basketball players
Baseball coaches from Ohio
Baseball players from Cleveland
Basketball players from Cleveland
Boston Red Sox players
Cleveland State Vikings baseball coaches
Dayton Flyers baseball players
Dayton Flyers men's basketball players
Denver Bears players
Erie Sailors players
Louisville Colonels (minor league) players
Major League Baseball pitchers
Minor league baseball executives
Minnesota Twins players
San Francisco Warriors draft picks
Seattle Pilots players
Toronto Maple Leafs (International League) players
Saint Ignatius High School (Cleveland) alumni